Cornelia may refer to:

People
Cornelia (name), a feminine given name
Cornelia (gens), a Roman family

Places
425 Cornelia, the asteroid Cornelia, a main-belt asteroid
Italy
Cornelia (Rome Metro), an underground station on Rome Metro
Via Cornelia, a Roman Empire road
South Africa
Cornelia, Free State, a town in South Africa
United States
Cornelia, Georgia, a city
Cornelia, Iowa, an unincorporated community
Cornelia, Missouri, an unincorporated community
Cornelia, Wisconsin, an unincorporated community
Cornelia Street, a street in Greenwich Village, Manhattan, New York City

Other
FV Cornelia Marie, a crabbing ship
"Cornelia Street", song by Taylor Swift

See also

 
 
Corniglia, one of the five villages in the Cinque Terre, Italy
Cornelius (disambiguation)